Boomdabash (often stylized as BoomDaBash) is an Italian dancehall reggae band formed in 2002.

They debuted in 2008 with the album Uno.

The band participated at the Sanremo Music Festival 2019 with the song "Per un milione".

Discography

Studio albums 
 Uno (2008)
 Mad(e) in Italy (2011)
 Superheroes (2013)
 Radio Revolution (2015)
 Barracuda (2018)

References

External links 
 

Musical groups established in 2002
Italian reggae musical groups
Musical groups from Apulia